The Stanley executive council was the 20th executive council of British Ceylon. The government was led by Governor Herbert Stanley.

Executive council members

See also
 Cabinet of Sri Lanka

References

1928 establishments in Ceylon
1931 disestablishments in Ceylon
Cabinets established in 1928
Cabinets disestablished in 1931
Ceylonese executive councils
Ministries of George V